Justin Moore is the debut studio album by the American country music artist of the same name. It was released on August 11, 2009 by Valory Music Group, a subsidiary of Big Machine Records. The album includes the singles "I Could Kick Your Ass", "Back That Thing Up", "Small Town USA", "Backwoods" and "How I Got to Be This Way". "Small Town USA" became Moore's first number one hit on the Billboard Hot Country Songs chart in September 2009. Moore co-wrote all but one of the songs on the album.

History
This album was part of a special promotion called "So You Want to Be a Record Label Executive." This promotion placed Moore's music on social networking sites such as MySpace and iLike, where fans could make playlists consisting of ten songs, and the top ten songs that are picked were included on Moore's album.

Critical reception

The album received mixed reviews from music critics. Karlie Justus of Engine 145 gave it three stars out of five, saying that Moore "pull[s] off his[...]influences with a country authenticity more capably than any other country up-and-comer at the moment;" she added that many of the other songs seemed to repeat the theme of "Small Town USA," but that "Grandpa", "Like There's No Tomorrow", and "Hank It" "rely on important details that obviously matter." Matt Bjorke of Roughstock gave the album a favorable review, saying that "Moore isn't making a record to not be on the radio, that is his goal, and he wants to bring a heavy dose of southern, country charm and twang back to it." The album received a two-and-a-half star rating from Allmusic critic Stephen Thomas Erlewine, who said that Moore "sees no shame in pandering" and called the album "anonymous country-rock." In 2017, Billboard contributor Chuck Dauphin placed three tracks from the album on his top 10 list of Moore's best songs: "Small Town USA" at number three, "Backwoods" at number five and "Back That Thing Up" at number ten.

Track listing

Personnel
 Steve Brewster - drums
 Perry Coleman - background vocals
 Larry Franklin - fiddle
 Tommy Harden - drums
 Mike Johnson - steel guitar
 Charlie Judge - keyboards
 Doug Kahan - bass guitar
 Troy Lancaster - electric guitar
 Justin Moore - lead vocals
 Mike Rojas - keyboards 
 Steve Sheehan - acoustic guitar, banjo
 Russell Terrell - background vocals

Chart performance

Weekly charts

Year-end charts

Singles

Certifications

References

2009 debut albums
Justin Moore albums
Big Machine Records albums
Albums produced by Jeremy Stover